Kurozumikyō (黒住教), literally "the Teachings of Kurozumi," is a Japanese new religion largely derived from Shinto roots and founded in 1846. The founder, a Shinto priest by the name of Kurozumi,  is claimed to have had a Divine union with Amaterasu, Goddess of the sun and chief Kami in the Shinto pantheon, in 1814.

The core beliefs of the sect center around this idea, and the assertion that Amaterasu is the source of all light and life, and creator of all the universe. Mankind is believed to be able to tap into the divine power of Amaterasu in order to heal the sick and perform other miracles. The sect is based in Okayama, and focuses on the virtues of sincerity, selflessness, hard work, and affirmation of the established social order.

Though Kurozumi's  divine experience occurred in 1814, the sect was not formally organized until 1846, when the priest and senior disciples assembled the Osadamegaki, putting into writing all the beliefs, values, and laws of the sect. Originally, their religious and missionary activity was tolerated by the feudal Okayama lord, as it did not threaten his power or conflict greatly with the religious beliefs already practiced in the area.

By the time of the Meiji Restoration in 1868, the sect had gained followers in Kyushu and western and southwestern Honshū, all the way up to Tokyo. It gained independence from the Board of Shinto Affairs in 1876, and established its own Shinto shrine, the Munetada Shrine, in Okayama in 1885. As of 1978, the group claimed 218,000 followers.

Muneharu Kurozumi, the Sixth Chief Patriarch of Kurozumikyō, is affiliated to the openly revisionist lobby Nippon Kaigi.

References

 Murakami Shigeyoshi (1985). "Kurozumikyō." Kōdansha Encyclopedia of Japan. Tokyo: Kōdansha Ltd.

External links
 Marukoto: The Teaching of Roundness

1846 establishments in Japan
Japanese new religions
Religious organizations based in Japan
Religious organizations established in 1846
Shinto new religious movements
13 Shinto Sects